Klim Gavrilov (born 27 March 2000)  is a Russian racing driver currently racing in the TCR Europe Touring Car Series. He won the 2019 FIA Motorsport Games Touring Car Cup representing Team Russia.

Racing record

Complete Russian Circuit Racing Series results
(key) (Races in bold indicate pole position) (Races in italics indicate fastest lap)

Complete TCR Europe Touring Car Series results
(key) (Races in bold indicate pole position) (Races in italics indicate fastest lap)

Complete TCR Italy Touring Car Championship results
(key) (Races in bold indicate pole position) (Races in italics indicate fastest lap)

† – Drivers did not finish the race, but were classified as they completed over 75% of the race distance.

References

External links

2000 births
Living people
Russian racing drivers
Sportspeople from Saint Petersburg
Russian Circuit Racing Series drivers
FIA Motorsport Games drivers
Karting World Championship drivers
TCR Europe Touring Car Series drivers